The Alexandria metropolitan area may refer to:

The Alexandria metropolitan area, Egypt
The Alexandria, Louisiana metropolitan area, United States
The Alexandria, Minnesota micropolitan area, United States

See also
Alexandria (disambiguation)